The 2002 NCAA Division III women's basketball tournament was the 21st annual tournament hosted by the NCAA to determine the national champion of Division III women's collegiate basketball in the United States.

Wisconsin–Stevens Point defeated St. Lawrence in the championship game, 67–65, to claim the Pointers' second Division III national title and first since 1987.

The championship rounds were hosted by Rose–Hulman Institute of Technology in Terre Haute, Indiana.

Bracket

Final Four

All-tournament team
 Carry Boehning, Wisconsin–Stevens Point
 Tara Schmitt, Wisconsin–Stevens Point
 Lindsey Rush, DePauw
 Megan Dietrichsen, St. Lawrence
 Cara Barbierri, St. Lawrence

See also
 2002 NCAA Division I women's basketball tournament
 2002 NCAA Division II women's basketball tournament
 2002 NAIA Division I women's basketball tournament
 2002 NAIA Division II women's basketball tournament
 2002 NCAA Division III men's basketball tournament

References

 
NCAA Division III women's basketball tournament
2002 in sports in Indiana
Wisconsin–Stevens Point Pointers
St. Lawrence Saints